Heart is a 2006 Indonesian film directed by Hanny R Saputra and starring Nirina Zubir, Irwansyah and Acha Septriasa. The film's soundtrack features the popular duet "My Heart" between Irwansyah and Acha Septriasa, which won Best Song at the MTV Indonesia Movie Awards in 2006. Heart also won Most Favourite Movie and Most Favourite Heart Melting Moment at the awards show.

Plot 
Heart is the story of childhood friends Rachel (Nirina Zubir) and Farel (Irwansyah). When Farel confesses he has fallen for new girl Luna (Acha Septriasa) Rachel's jealousy and anger results in a horrific accident. Rachel finds herself in the same hospital as Luna who is suffering from a heart condition and she witnesses the extent of Farel and Luna's love for each other. Now Rachel must decide if she can make the ultimate sacrifice for her best friend and the man she loves.

Cast
 Nirina Zubir - Rachel
 Irwansyah - Farel
 Acha Septriasa - Luna
 Rachel Amanda - little Rachel 
 Irshadi Bagas - little Farel 
 Ari Sihasale - Adam (Luna's father)
 Unique Priscilla - Rahayu (Rachel's mother)

Soundtrack

The Soundtrack of this film that has been recorded in Jakarta and Beijing for the Soundtrack could be an Indonesian artists and Score that played by the China Philharmonic Orchestra conducted by Aksan Sjuman.

Track listing

Songs

Scores

External links 

Review at Cinema Online Singapore

2006 films
Films shot in Indonesia
2000s Indonesian-language films
Indonesian drama films
2006 drama films
Remakes of Indonesian films
Films scored by Melly Goeslaw
Films scored by Anto Hoed
Films directed by Hanny Saputra